The DLA Logistics Information Service, or formerly the Defense Logistics Information Service provides logistics and information technology services to the United States Department of Defense, Federal agencies, and international partners. It is headquartered at the Hart–Dole–Inouye Federal Center in Battle Creek, Michigan.

External links
 DLA Logistics Information Service Home Page
 DLA Information
 Web Federal Logistics (WEBFLIS) Database Search
 DLIS Items of Supply Catalog
 Federal Logistics (FEDLOG) Database Search

Defense Logistics Agency
United States Department of Defense information technology